This is an incomplete index of leading Scottish noble family seats.

The Royal Family

Dukes

Marquesses

Earls

Viscounts

Lords of Parliament

Minor barons (feudal barons)

Baronets and Lairds

See also
Scottish clan
List of family seats of English nobility
List of family seats of Irish nobility
List of family seats of Welsh nobility

References

External links
 National Trust for Scotland
 Historic Scotland
 Historic Houses Association

Scottish society
Peerage of Scotland

Lists of British nobility